The , commonly known as , is the smallest of the seven constituent companies of the Japan Railways Group (JR Group). It operates  of intercity and local rail services in the four prefectures on the island of Shikoku in Japan. The company has its headquarters in Takamatsu, Kagawa.

Lines

In 1988 JR Shikoku, unlike other JR companies, discontinued the classification of its rail lines as either main, secondary, or branch lines. Prior to the change, the Dosan, Kōtoku, Tokushima, and Yosan Lines had all been main lines.

Each line is color-coded and labeled with a letter, in conjunction with which a number is assigned to each station on the line. For example, Naruto Station on the Naruto Line (labeled N) is numbered N10. Although this method is now widely used by rail companies, especially metro systems in Japan, JR Shikoku was the first JR company to adopt it.

Train services 
JR Shikoku provides intercity transportation with its limited express services, connecting major cities on the island of Shikoku with Okayama on Honshū. The company also operates local trains.

References

External links

  
  

 
Companies based in Kagawa Prefecture
Railway companies established in 1987
1987 establishments in Japan